Governorate or provincial elections were held in Iraq on 20 April 2013, to replace the local councils in the governorates of Iraq that were elected in the Iraqi governorate elections of 2009. Elections took place in 12 of Iraq's 18 governorates. Elections didn't take place in the 3 governorates forming the Kurdistan Region or Kirkuk, Anbar, or Nineveh, meaning that a total of 378 provincial council seats were up for election.

The Iraqi government later decided on 19 March to delay the elections in the governorates of Anbar and Nineveh due to ongoing instability caused by the insurgency and the ongoing protests, prompting criticism from Muqtada al-Sadr and John Kerry. Elections for Anbar and Nineveh were held on 20 June.

Electoral Law
There have been several disputes about the electoral law that is to be used for the election. The current electoral law, which was also used in the 2009 election, states that if certain parties don't get enough votes, their votes and seats are given to the larger parties. In the 2009 election this led to many smaller parties failing to take any seats. Because of the disproportionate affect this law had on smaller parties, the Supreme Court of Iraq declared the law unconstitutional, as it restricted democracy.

In spite of this ruling, and mostly due to the fact that because the law benefits the largest parties they have little incentive to change it, the law has yet to be changed. If not changed, the unconstitutional nature of the law however would make the 2013 election results vulnerable to a legal challenge. As a result, although this does not currently effect the work of the Independent High Electoral Commission, IHEC has been calling on the Iraqi government to pass changes to the law.

In response to this, on 13 December 2012 the Iraqi parliament voted to adopt the Sainte-Laguë method as the new electoral method.

Participants
Parties and candidates wishing to stand for election had to register by the deadline of 25 November 2012. By the time of the deadline 243 entities, including 16 independent candidates, had registered, with some of the entities registering to participate for the first time. As a result of the large number of applications submitted for the registration of political coalitions for the election, IHEC decided to extend the deadline for submissions from the 13th to the 18th of December.

One of the biggest changes to the political coalitions taking part is the fact that the State of Law Coalition has expanded from its traditional supporters, with former opponents such as the Badr Organization, the National Reform Trend, the Islamic Virtue Party, and the secular Shiite White Iraqiya Bloc all joining the coalition for the election. Despite the massive size of the coalition, it is exclusively Shiite.

According to IHEC, a total of 8,224 candidates registered to run in the elections, including 131 candidates who have since been barred by IHEC from running due to their ties to the Iraqi Ba'ath Party.

Preliminary results
According to preliminary results from the 12 governorates were elections were held, Nouri al-Maliki's expanded State of Law Coalition would come in first place with 115 seats, second would come ISCI with 80 seats and Sadr Movement would win 50.

With 87-90% of the vote counted, the results were as following:

Results

Total seats

Al Anbar Governorate

Babil Governorate

Baghdad Governorate

Basra Governorate

Dhi Qar Governorate

Diyala Governorate

Karbala Governorate

Maysan Governorate

Muthanna Governorate

Najaf Governorate

Nineveh Governorate

Al-Qādisiyyah Governorate

Saladin Governorate

Wasit Governorate

References